Jill Jacobson is an American actress, best known for her performances on television.

Her credits include the television series Crazy Like a Fox, Falcon Crest, Star Trek: The Next Generation, Quantum Leap, Who's The Boss?, Murphy Brown and Star Trek: Deep Space Nine and the 2001 television movie After the Storm.

External links

Year of birth missing (living people)
Living people
American television actresses
21st-century American women